The St. Joseph Cathedral is a religious building belonging to the Catholic Church and is located in Mopti in the fifth administrative region of Mopti in central African country of Mali. The cathedral is located near Independence Avenue and Kanaga and Le Fleuve hotels. It was established in 1953 as the Parish of St. Joseph.

It is a temple that follows the Roman or Latin rite and serves as the seat of the diocese of Mopti (Dioecesis Moptiensis or Diocèse de Mopti) which was created in 1964 by bula More institutoque of Pope Paul VI.

It is under the pastoral responsibility of the Bishop Georges Fonghoro.

See also
Roman Catholicism in Mali
St. Joseph Cathedral (disambiguation)

References

Roman Catholic cathedrals in Mali
Mopti
Roman Catholic churches completed in 1953
20th-century Roman Catholic church buildings